Viswant Duddumpudi is an Indian actor who works in Telugu films. He made his debut with Kerintha (2015).

Early life
Duddumpudi was born in Samarlakota, Kakinada. He started his schooling in Timpany School Visakhapatnam after which he changed to Kakinada and then to Hyderabad. After completing his intermediate in Vizag FIITJEE, he went to Tamil Nadu to pursue his Engineering in PSG Institute Of Advanced Studies at Coimbatore, India and then to State university of New York for further studies.

Career

Duddumpudi first caught attention with his debut movie Kerintha, directed by Sai Kiran Adivi, produced by Dil Raju, in which he appeared opposite Tejaswi Madivada. Prior to Kerintha, Duddumpudi was shortlisted for a few films, but his education stopped him from acting. He received a call from Kerintha's director after doing auditions and seeing the video reels sent by him. Then he came down for the movie after completing his graduation.

Filmography

References

External links

Living people
Male actors from Visakhapatnam
Male actors in Telugu cinema
Indian male film actors
21st-century Indian male actors
Male actors from Andhra Pradesh
People from Kakinada
People from East Godavari district
Indian male actors
Telugu male actors
1993 births